Prapratno  is a port village in Croatia. It is connected by the D414 highway and by ferry. There are 70 spots in the parking lot and the beach itself has a capacity of 2000. the beach itself is 250 by 20 meters. pets are not allowed.

References

Populated places in Dubrovnik-Neretva County
Mljet